This list of fictional big cats is subsidiary to the List of fictional cats and other felines and includes notable large feline characters that appear in various works of fiction. This list excludes hybrids such as ligers and tiglons.

Literature

Film

Baby, a tame leopard in the film Bringing Up Baby starring Cary Grant
Charlie, a cougar raised in captivity and grown to be wild in the film Charlie, the Lonesome Cougar
Duma, a cheetah in the film Duma and Walt Disney's live-action film Cheetah
Elsa the Lioness, raised by Joy Adamson in Born Free
Kumal and Sangha, two separated and reunited tigers in the 2004 film Two Brothers
Joe and Janet, two lions at the Franklin Park Zoo in Zookeeper
Clarence, a lion in the 1965 film Clarence, the Cross-Eyed Lion
Proxima, Frank Wolff's pet jaguar in the 2021 film Jungle Cruise (film).

Television

Agapito, lion from Carrascolendas
Daniel Striped Tiger on Mister Rogers' Neighborhood
Drooper, lion from the Banana Splits
Ludicrous Lion, peddler character from H.R. Pufnstuf
Clarence, lion from Daktari based on the film Clarence, the Cross-Eyed Lion
Cleopatra, Theo, Lionel and Leona from Between the Lions
Shiva, a Bengal Tigress from The Walking Dead
Cruise, a cheetah in Power Rangers Beast Morphers serving as Devon's Beast Bot partner

Animation

Comics
 Adolar, a lion in the pantomime comic Der Löwe Adolar by Becker-Kasch.
Battle Cat, in the Masters of the Universe franchise.
 Dr. Lion, the headmaster of the school in Jungle Jinks and its spin-off Dr. Lion's Boys, a British comic strip by Arthur White  and Mabel F. Taylor.
 Dr. Lion, the doctor in Rupert Bear's stories. 
 Galileu, a jaguar in Turma do Pererê
 Herrmann, lion of Jimmy van Doren in Stephen Desberg and Daniel Desorgher's Jimmy van Doren. 
Hobbes, an anthropomorphic stuffed tiger and best friend of Calvin in the comic strip Calvin and Hobbes
Joe le Tigre, a tiger in Mic Delinx and Christian Godard's La Jungle en Folie. 
Jiba, a tiger in Shinmai Fukei Kiruko-san
 Leo the Friendly Lion, a comic strip by Bert Felstead.
King Lionel, a lion in Lionel's Kingdom
Lyle and Lana from Animal Crackers comic strip
Max, a bobcat companion of G.I. Joe pointman Spearhead in G.I. Joe: A Real American Hero
Meo, a tiger in History's Strongest Disciple Kenichi.
 Moloch, Corentin's pet tiger in Paul Cuvelier's Corentin.
 The nameless lion who is the sidekick of the nameless shepherd's dog in Le Génie des Alpages by F'murr.
Richie, from the manga One Piece
Shiva, a tiger in The Walking Dead.
 Tammananny Tiger, character in Walt Kelly's Pogo. 
Tawky Tawny, an anthropomorphic tiger who appears as a supporting character of DC Comics' Captain Marvel.
 Tiger Tim, a tiger created by Julius Stafford Baker.
 Lying Cat, a Somewhat sentient feline, Who detects lies, from Saga.

Video games
Big the Cat, a supporting character from the Sonic the Hedgehog series
Bubsy, a bobcat from the eponymous series
Carol Tea, a wildcat and playable character from Freedom Planet
Charr, from Guild Wars and Guild Wars 2 
El Jefe, from Sly Cooper: Thieves in Time 
Gado, Shina, Long and Shenlong, from Bloody Roar
Guenhwyvar, a magical black panther from the Astral Plane, in the fictional universe of the Forgotten Realms
Hunter the Cheetah, from the Spyro series
Katt and Tiga, from Breath of Fire II
 The Khajit, a race of humanoid cat people, from the Elder Scrolls franchise
Neon Tiger, a Maverick from Mega Man X3
Neyla and Rajan, from Sly 2: Band of Thieves
Octavio, from Sly 3: Honor Among Thieves
Pura, from the Crash Bandicoot series
T'ai Fu, from T'ai Fu: Wrath of the Tiger
Trap Shadow, a black and purple tiger armed with bear traps who can turn invisible, from Skylanders: Swap Force.
Tuff Luck, a tigress armed with Traptanium-forged warblades and good luck, from Skylanders: Trap Team.
Suku, Awilix's jaguar from Smite (video game)

Legends
Dawon, tiger from Hindu mythology
Maahes, Egyptian lion god of war, son of Bast
Panther, panther with sweet breath in Medieval Bestiary
Sekhmet, a goddess in Egyptian mythology with the head of a lioness
Underwater panther, in Native American mythology
Were-jaguar, shapeshifting jaguar spirit in Olmec mythology
Byakko, white tiger in Japanese mythology
The Yali, a mythical lion from Hindu mythology

Mascots and others
Chester Cheetah, mascot of Cheetos
Exxon tiger, mascot for Enco Extra and Esso Extra gasoline brands introduced in the 1950s
Leo, mascot of film and television studio Metro Goldwyn Mayer
Ritche, Mascot of the Rochester Institute of Technology.
Roary, mascot of the Detroit Lions American football team.
Paws, mascot of the Detroit Tigers baseball team.
Tony the Tiger, mascot of Frosted Flakes
Willie the Wildcat, mascot of the Kansas State University Wildcats.
Who Dey, mascot of the Cincinnati Bengals American football team.
Pouncer, mascot of the University of Memphis American football and basketball teams.
Aubie, mascot of the Auburn University American football team

See also
 List of fictional cats and felines — Mixed list of mostly smaller felines
 List of individual cats — Nonfictional cats

References

Lists of cats
Big cats